Billy Riley (22 June 1896 – 27 August 1977) was an English practitioner and teacher of catch wrestling.  As a trainer in the sport, he taught some of the leading post-World War II figures in catch wrestling at his training school "The Snake Pit" in Wigan, Lancashire, England.

Early days
During his days as a moulder in the Lancashire town of Wigan, Riley trained with the local miners in the art of Lancashire catch-as-catch-can wrestling, one of the roughest and most loved sports of the region.

The tough Wigan native soon began showing extraordinary submission skills. Riley was known to be a devastating "hooker" and it showed in his wrestling matches as he soon gained notoriety for breaking his opponent's arms. During the 1930s Riley travelled to Africa to capture a British Empire championship from Jack Robinson.

The Snake Pit
Riley decided to teach catch wrestling in Wigan. He bought a small plot of land in the 1950s on Pyke Street in the town and with the help of his students, built a gymnasium on the land. Billy Riley's gym became known as the Snake Pit.

The gym soon became popular for producing some of the most skilled catch wrestlers in the world. Men such as Karl Gotch (Istaz), Bert Assirati, Melvin Riss (Harold Winstanley), John Foley, Jack Dempsey (Tommy Moore), Billy Joyce (Bob Robinson), Billy Robinson and Billy Riley's son Ernie Riley all attended The Snake Pit.

Reopening
When the son of a former student, Roy Wood, and the son of Wood's friend wanted to learn wrestling they traveled to Wigan, only to see the school in complete disrepair. The roof had literally caved in. With the help of locals, Roy Wood managed to get the gym started again. Riley's gym was reopened. However, this time, since Roy's son Darren and nephew Paul had wanted to learn, the gym was opened to children. Riley decided to take a seat by the mat and let Wood coach.

Teaching the children was a new concept for both Roy and Riley. The results though, soon showed that the teaching at the Snake Pit was still world class. By the age of 10, Darren had won the British Championships alongside local children Paddy Govan, Kevin Govan, Tony Leyland and Neil Maxwell who were also Riley's wrestlers. After competitions, the children would go round to see Riley and his wife, and take the medals and trophies which they had won.

Riley died in 1977. Roy Wood and Tommy Heyes kept the Snake Pit running, and the children visited Riley's wife to show her the trophies and achievements made possible by the efforts of her husband.

The Aspull Wrestling Club
The next major change for the gym came in the mid-1980s, when Yorkshire TV filmed the documentary "First Tuesday - The Wigan Hold". The focus of the film was on the lack of resources available to the otherwise world class British wrestlers.

This led to a Sports Council offer to rebuild the site. At the time there were various problems, and it was decided that it would be best to relocate the gym. Roy, therefore, bought a new building a couple of miles up the road in Aspull. It then became named the Aspull Olympic Wrestling Club (AKA Riley's). Osamu Matsunami, a Japanese wrestler with a very keen interest in the history of wrestling, saw the documentary and then saved up and came to England. He spent 6 month periods at a time wrestling at AOWC. He then went on to coach with Billy Robinson in Japan.

Roy Wood was soon recognized in Japan as one of the premiere trainers of submission wrestling. Roy was invited to train at the Yokohoma Arena. He was asked to prolong his stay in Japan, where he could train some of the finest athletes in the world, but Roy opted to stay in Aspull.

The Aspull Wrestling Club has since then become a hotbed for youngsters and athletes who want to train in submission wrestling catch-as-catch-can style.

References

External links

The Japanese Pro-Wrestling Reality Based Martial Art Connection
Website of the film 'Catch - the hold not taken', a documentary on the history of Riley's gym

1890s births
1977 deaths
Sportspeople from Wigan
British catch wrestlers
English male professional wrestlers
Professional wrestling trainers
20th-century professional wrestlers